(born August 17, 1955), better known by his ring name , is a Japanese actor, retired kickboxer and the founder of shoot boxing.

Career 
Murata started competing in kickboxing at age of 16, being trained in the Nishio Gym. He adopted the name of Takeshi Caesar and won the Asia Pacific Kickboxing Federation Welterweight Championship, making a name for himself. In 1984, he became interested in professional wrestling and was introduced to Satoru Sayama, who trained him in shoot-style at his Super Tiger Gym. Caesar then was contacted by Karl Gotch and Akira Maeda and was part of the Universal Wrestling Federation. After the fall of UWF, his experiences with its wrestling style induced him to creating a similarly mixed style of kickboxing, which he called shootboxing. His company had his first event in 1985, and had working agreements with Newborn UWF and later with Fighting Network RINGS and Pancrase.

Championships and accomplishments 
Asia Pacific Kickboxing Federation
APKF Welterweight Championship (1 time) 
APKF Middleweight championship (1 time) 
Japan Shootboxing Association
JSBA Hawkweight 1st champion (1986) 
World Shootboxing Association
WSBA Hawkweight 1st champion (1988)

Kickboxing record

Filmography

See also
Shoot boxing

References 

Japanese male kickboxers
Welterweight kickboxers
Middleweight kickboxers
Shoot boxing
Sportspeople from Yamaguchi Prefecture
1955 births
Living people